An Entrepreneur in residence, or Executive in residence (EIR), is a position most often held by successful entrepreneurs in venture capital firms, private equity firms, startup accelerators, law firms or business schools. The EIR typically leads, or has led, a small, early-stage, emerging company deemed to have high-growth potential, or which has demonstrated high-growth in its number of employees, annual revenue, or both. An institutional fund may provide an entrepreneur in residence, or executive in residence, with the working capital to nurture expansion, new-product development, or restructuring of a company's operations, management, or ownership.

Venture capital, private equity, startup accelerators
In a venture capital fund, a private equity fund or a startup accelerator; the entrepreneur in residence works with the general partners and assists the firm's portfolio companies by leveraging their industry knowledge, expertise and network. In addition he/she is expected to evaluate new investments opportunities for the venture capital or private equity fund, especially if it is in their domain of expertise. The venture capital firm usually benefits by getting significant access to the new company started by the EIR. This is due to the fact that the general partners are typically the first investor in EIR's new company, giving them a chance to invest before angel investors and other venture capital firms.

Business school
In business schools, an EIR provides guidance to MBA students who are starting their own companies. The type of nurturing an EIR can provide to a business school environment helps students and professors by sharing their industry experience and expertise. The EIR helps students and professors develop new ideas and turn them into sustainable ventures.

Corporate EIRs
EIR's, or Entrepreneurs in Residence were once found mostly at venture capital firms, but the role has expanded and you can now find them at a variety of companies - including tech companies.

At a law firm, the entrepreneur in residence provides professional services to the firm's clients. Law firms may offer the advisory service to entrepreneurs in order to gain clients by helping them with venture decisions and networks.

References

Entrepreneurship
Business occupations